Rangnath Dol is a Hindu temple dedicated to the god Shiva on the bank of Joysagar Tank. It was built in 1703 by Sukhrungphaa near the main gateway on way from the Joysagar tank to the Talatal Ghar. Large numbers of devotees continue to visit and offer puja in this temple. The sanctum of the temple enshrines a lingam. A do-chala mandapa is attached with the sanctum.

References

Hindu temples in Assam
Shiva temples in Assam
18th-century Hindu temples